Vilankulo Airport   is an airport in Mozambique that serves the city of Vilankulo in the Inhambane Province.

Modernisation
In 2009 a Chinese company called Anhui Foreign Economic Construction Corporation began construction work on the airport with an estimated cost of US$9 million to refurbish, expand and modernize the airport. The new terminal building was inaugurated on 13 April 2011 by Mozambican President Armando Guebuza. The modern air-conditioned International airport will make it possible for larger aircraft to access the airport and use the facilities. Since the expansion of the passenger terminal it has a capacity of 200,000 passengers, up from its previous 75,000 capacity.

Airlines and destinations

References

Airports in Mozambique
Buildings and structures in Inhambane Province